Croxby is a hamlet and former civil parish in the West Lindsey district of Lincolnshire, England.

Croxby deserted medieval village (DMV) lies to the north-east from the church, with Croxby Hall at the bottom, and along the sides of, a narrow stream running through a chalk valley. At the time of the Domesday survey Croxby had a population of 36.

The parish of Croxby was abolished in 1936 when it became part of the parish of Thoresway.

Croxby church is dedicated to All Saints and is a Grade II* listed building of ironstone dating from the 12th century, with later additions and restorations. The font is also 12th-century.

Croxby Hall is a Grade II* listed building of red brick dating from 1730.

References

External links

Hamlets in Lincolnshire
West Lindsey District
Former civil parishes in Lincolnshire